Habib Rahman (born 1933) is a Pakistani weightlifter. He competed in the men's bantamweight event at the 1956 Summer Olympics.

References

1933 births
Living people
Pakistani male weightlifters
Olympic weightlifters of Pakistan
Weightlifters at the 1956 Summer Olympics
Place of birth missing (living people)
20th-century Pakistani people